Backbench Student is a 2013 Indian Telugu-language romance film written and directed by Madhura Sreedhar Reddy. The film stars Mahat Raghavendra, Piaa Bajpai and Archana Kavi. BBS was produced by M. V. K. Reddy under the Shirdi Sai Combines banner and presented by Multidimension Entertainments. The protagonist (Mahat Raghavendra) fails in at least 16 subjects in his studies, and the story is about how this student’s life turns out to be. BBS was canned in 55 days of shooting in Hyderabad and Visakhapatnam with Prasad G. K. as the director of photography. Back Bench Student  is set to be released worldwide on 15 March in more than 200 theatres. This film marks the lead debut of Raghavendra.

Plot
Karthik (Mahat Raghavendra) is a careless engineering student, who is least bothered about his studies, the result of which is 16 backlogs. He is in love with his classmate Priyanka (Archana Kavi), who splits from him and leaves for USA to pursue MS. Hell breaks loose when his parents (Sarath Babu and Pragathi) come to know about the backlogs. While he is in search of a job to support himself, he hooks up with Chaitra (Piaa Bajpai). Meanwhile, Priyanka discontinues her studies and comes back from the US in search of Karthik. She learns that Karthik is in love with Chaitra and is disheartened and wonders what made Karthik fall for Chaitra. What happens next forms the rest of the story.

Cast
 Mahat Raghavendra as Karthik
 Piaa Bajpai as Chaitra
 Archana Kavi as Priyanka
 Brahmanandam as Kareena Kapoor
 Sarath Babu as Karthik's Father
 Ali as Mr. NO Diwakar, Project Manager
 Pragathi as Karthik's mother
 Bannerjee as Priyanka's Father
 Insi Gutta

Soundtrack

The soundtrack of Back Bench Student consists of 7 songs composed by Sunil Kashyap, the lyrics of which were written by Sirasri and Lakshmi Bhoopal.

Critical reception

Sangeetha Devi Dundoo of The Hindu praised the film in the departments of acting, music and cinematography and said that, "The intention is honest but a smart script to back it is sorely missing."

Notes

References

2013 films
2010s Telugu-language films
2013 romance films
Indian romance films